The Political Machine 2020 is a government simulation game from Stardock and the fifth game in the Political Machine series, in which the player leads a campaign to elect the President of the United States. The player accomplishes this goal by traveling from state to state and engaging in a variety of activities to either raise money or raise poll numbers. The game was released on March 3, 2020.

Presidential candidates

Democrats

Republicans 

It is not possible to run as a third-party or independent candidate.

Reception 
Giving it a rating of 65, New Game Network described the game as "fairly shallow, and there seems to be a number of steps back from the 2016 version - aside from the improved visuals." VentureBeat says "as a bare-bones remake of an existing game, it’s not bad," and "it whets my appetite for a more sophisticated and realistic simulation".

Notes

References

External links 
 Official website

2020 United States presidential election in popular culture
2020 video games
Android (operating system) games
Cultural depictions of Al Gore
Cultural depictions of Alexander Hamilton
Cultural depictions of Barack Obama
Cultural depictions of Bill Clinton
Cultural depictions of Donald Trump
Cultural depictions of George W. Bush
Cultural depictions of George Washington
Cultural depictions of Hillary Clinton
Cultural depictions of James Madison
Cultural depictions of Joe Biden
Cultural depictions of John Adams
Cultural depictions of politicians
Cultural depictions of presidents of the United States
Cultural depictions of Ronald Reagan
Cultural depictions of Sarah Palin
Cultural depictions of Thomas Jefferson
Early access video games
Government simulation video games
IOS games
Political satire video games
Satirical video games
Stardock games
Video games based on real people
Video games developed in the United States
Video games set in the United States
Windows games
Windows-only games
Multiplayer and single-player video games